The avocet snipe eel (Avocettina infans) is a snipe eel of the family Nemichthyidae, found in all oceans except the Mediterranean and the eastern Pacific, at depths between 50 and 4,500 m.

References
 
 
 Tony Ayling & Geoffrey Cox, Collins Guide to the Sea Fishes of New Zealand,  (William Collins Publishers Ltd, Auckland, New Zealand 1982) 

Nemichthyidae
Fish described in 1878
Taxa named by Albert Günther